Events in the year 1976 in Belgium.

Incumbents
Monarch: Baudouin
Prime Minister: Leo Tindemans

Events

 3 January – Flooding in Ruisbroek.
 April – World Environment and Resources Council conference in Brussels.
 16 May – Niki Lauda wins the 1976 Belgian Grand Prix at Circuit Zolder
 22 June to 8 July – Longest heatwave recorded in Belgium, with 16 days of temperatures over 30°C.
 8 July – European People's Party founded in Brussels
 20 September – Brussels Metro opens.
 10 October – Municipal elections confirm the fusion of the Belgian municipalities, reducing the number of local governments from 2,359 to 589.

Publications
 OECD, Economic Surveys: Belgium–Luxembourg.
 Jonathan E. Helmreich, Belgium and Europe: A Study in Small Power Diplomacy (The Hague, Mouton)

Art and architecture

Buildings
 Astro Tower, Brussels, completed.

Births
 18 January – Laurence Courtois, tennis player
 29 January – Belle Perez, singer
 27 February – Ludovic Capelle, cyclist
 3 March – Joos Valgaeren, footballer
 4 March – Regi Penxten, DJ
 11 June – Gaëtan Englebert, footballer
 17 June – Sven Nys, cyclist  
 10 July – Wilfried Cretskens, cyclist
 12 July – Dave Bruylandts, cyclist
 26 August – Freya Piryns, politician
 19 November – Benny Vansteelant, athlete (died 2007)
 16 November – Mario Barravecchia, singer
 4 December – Mbo Mpenza, footballer
 11 December – Timmy Simons, footballer

Deaths
 6 January – Henry George (born 1891), cyclist
 28 January – Marcel Broodthaers (born 1924), artist 
 17 February – Jean Servais (born 1910), actor
 16 March – Albert Lilar (born 1900), politician
 13 April – Gustave Danneels (born 1913), cyclist
 10 August – Fernand Dehousse (born 1906), politician
 29 December – Ivo Van Damme (born 1954), athlete

References

 
1970s in Belgium
Belgium
Years of the 20th century in Belgium
Belgium